William Doyce “Buddy” Killen (November 13, 1932  – November 1, 2006) was an American record producer and music publisher, and a former owner of Trinity Broadcasting Network and Tree International Publishing, the largest country music publishing business, before he sold it to CBS Records in 1989.  He was also the owner of Killen Music Group, involved with more diverse genres of music, such as pop and rap.

Life
Killen was born in Florence, Alabama.  He was a bass player in the Grand Ole Opry before he was hired, in 1953, to listen to new songs in a new business started by Jack Stapp, the manager of the Grand Ole Opry.  When Stapp died in 1980, Killen became the sole owner of Stapp's company, Tree International Publishing.  During his early career he worked with artists such as Dolly Parton, Dottie West, Louise Mandrell, Diana Trask, Exile, Roger Miller, Joe Tex, Ronnie McDowell and T. G. Sheppard.

Later career
With his Killen Music Group, Killen published some songs on the soundtrack to the film Idlewild.  He also co-published the popular "Me and My Gang" by Rascal Flatts and worked with artists such as Faith Hill, Trace Adkins, Kenny Chesney, Reba McEntire and Bill Anderson. He also worked at the W.O. Smith School of Music.

Death
Killen died in Nashville, Tennessee on November 1, 2006, twelve days before his 74th birthday. The cause of death was pancreatic cancer.

References

External links
[ Allmusic]
Killen-related business stories from NashvillePost.com
Alabama Music Hall of Fame 1985 inductee Buddy Killen

1932 births
2006 deaths
Musicians from Florence, Alabama
Record producers from Alabama
American country songwriters
American male songwriters
Deaths from pancreatic cancer
Musicians from Nashville, Tennessee
Deaths from cancer in Tennessee
20th-century American musicians
Songwriters from Tennessee
Songwriters from Alabama
20th-century American male musicians